Charlie Chan in Panama is a 1940 mystery film starring Sidney Toler. It is an unaccredited remake of Jacques Deval's novel "Marie Galante", produced by 20th Century Fox in 1934, directed by Henry King.

Plot
Charlie Chan must stop a spy from destroying the Panama Canal, trapping a Navy fleet on its way to the Pacific after maneuvers in the Atlantic. As the U.S. fleet prepares to navigate the waters of the Panama Canal, Panama City becomes rife with spies.

A new group of suspects appears with the arrival of a sea plane bound for Balboa. Among the suspects are novelist Clivedon Compton, matronly school teacher Miss Jennie Finch, sinister scientist Dr. Rudolph Grosser, café proprietor Manolo, singer Kathi Lenesch (real name Kathi von Tzardas), cigarette salesman Achmed Halide, government engineer Richard Cabot and government agent Godley.

Upon landing, Godley goes to a hat shop owned by Fu Yuen, alias Charlie Chan, to enlist the sleuth's help in unmasking the deadly spy known only as Reiner. Just as Godley is about to divulge Reiner's real identity, he falls to the ground, dead, leaving Chan to expose Reiner before the spy can sabotage the canal.

As the other suspects are murdered, one by one, first Compton, then Manolo, Chan learns that the canal's Miraflores locks are to be blown up at ten that night. Chan then sequesters the suspects at the plant, forcing Miss Finch to expose herself as Reiner in order to escape death. With Reiner under arrest, the fleet sails safely through the locks to protect democracy.

Cast
Sidney Toler as Charlie Chan
Jean Rogers as Kathi Lenesch
Lionel Atwill as Cliveden Compton
Mary Nash as Miss Jennie Finch
Victor Sen Yung as Jimmy Chan (as Sen Yung)
Kane Richmond as Richard Cabot
Chris-Pin Martin as Sergeant Montero
Lionel Royce as Dr. Rudolph Grosser
Helen Ericson as Stewardess
Jack La Rue as Emil Manolo
Edwin Stanley as Governor D.C. Webster
Donald Douglas as Captain Lewis
Frank Puglia as Achmed Halide
Addison Richards as R.J. Godley
Edward Keane as Dr. Fredericks
Charles Stevens as Native Fisherman

External links

Copy of film at Internet Archive

1940 films
American black-and-white films
1940 crime films
1940 mystery films
Charlie Chan films
Films based on works by Jacques Deval
20th Century Fox films
American mystery films
American crime films
Films directed by Norman Foster
1940s American films